Pennepalli is a small village in Nayudupet Mandal (Gudur Taluk) of Nellore District in Andhra Pradesh, India.

References

Villages in Nellore district